Macron is a genus of sea snails, marine gastropod mollusks in the family Pseudolividae.

Species
Species within the genus Macron include:
 Macron aethiops (Reeve, 1847) Pacific coast of Mexico
 Macron lividus (A. Adams, 1855) tide pools on the Southern California coast
 Macron mcleani Vermeij, 1998
 Macron orcutti Dall, 1918 Baja California coast
 Macron wrightii H. Adams, 1865

References

Pseudolividae
Monotypic gastropod genera